Lisbet Jakobsen (born 21 January 1987 in Nexø) is a Danish rower.

Jacobsen competed at the 2016 Summer Olympics in the double sculls event. She also won a bronze medal at the 2008 World Rowing Championships.

References 

 

1987 births
Living people
Danish female rowers
People from Bornholm
World Rowing Championships medalists for Denmark
Rowers at the 2016 Summer Olympics
Olympic rowers of Denmark
Sportspeople from the Capital Region of Denmark